Narasin is a coccidiostat and antibacterial agent. It is a derivative of salinomycin with an additional methyl group. Narasin is produced by fermentation of a strain of Streptomyces aureofaciens.

References 

Antibiotics
Antiparasitic agents
Carboxylic acids
Secondary alcohols
Tertiary alcohols
Ketones
Tetrahydropyrans
Tetrahydrofurans
Spiro compounds
Ketals